Fletcher Christian (1812 – 5 April 1852) served as magistrate of the British Overseas Territory of Pitcairn Island in 1842. Christian was the grandson of Fletcher Christian, the Bounty mutineer, through his son Charles Christian. He was the cousin of Thursday October Christian II. Like Thursday, Christian was of Polynesian descent from 3 of his grandparents. His mother was Sully, the daughter of Teio.

Ancestry

References

Pitcairn Islands people of English descent
Pitcairn Islands people of Manx descent
Pitcairn Islands people of Polynesian descent
Pitcairn Islands politicians
1812 births
1852 deaths